Jiřina Steimarová (24 January 1916, Prague, Austria-Hungary – 7 October 2007, Prague, Czech Republic) was a Czech film and television actress.

Steimarová made her screen debut in the controversial 1933 Hedy Lamarr film Ecstasy. She appeared in nearly 40 films and TV shows during her career.

Family
Her parents were both actors. She was also the mother of actress Evelýna Steimarová and actor Jiří Kodet. Jiří Kodet, an award winning actor, predeceased his mother, dying from cancer in 2005.

Death
Jiřina Steimarová died on 7 October 2007, aged 91.

Selected filmography
 Ecstasy (1933)
 Irca's Romance (1936)

References

External links

Jirina Steimarova obituary (Czech)
Jirina Steimarova obituary (Czech)

1916 births
2007 deaths
Czech film actresses
Actresses from Prague
Czech stage actresses
Czech television actresses
Prague Conservatory alumni
Czechoslovak actresses